Crimen  (also known as ...And Suddenly It's Murder! and Killing in Monte Carlo) is a 1960 Italian whodunit-comedy movie by Mario Camerini.

The movie had two remakes: the first, Io non vedo, tu non parli, lui non sente, was directed by the same Camerini in 1971 and starred Gastone Moschin, Enrico Montesano and Alighiero Noschese, the second, Once Upon a Crime, was filmed in 1992 by Eugene Levy and has John Candy and James Belushi in the main roles. It was also remade in Hindi titled 36 China Town.

Plot 
Five people, all united by the fact of being on a train to Monte Carlo, will find themselves being involved in the murder of an elderly millionaire of Dutch origin, a regular guest of the glamorous Riviera location.
The bride and groom Remo and Marina, hairdressers, are attracted by the lure of fortune in gambling, with which they intend to start their own business, the Commander Alberto Franzetti, after a failed attempt to "detoxify" from the demon of gambling, is back in Monaco, where his wife is waiting for him (Dorian Gray), the pair of borgatari Quirino and Giovanna is committed to bring a dog to millionaire Dutch for the lucrative reward. The six main characters, for different reasons, are involved in the investigation and, all of them distrusting of the police, try to extricate themselves from the quandary by lying and raising more and more suspicions on themselves. Thanks to the research of the Commissioner of Police (Bernard Blier) they will be acquitted in the end, while the real culprits will be exposed.

Cast 
 Alberto Sordi: Alberto Franzetti
 Vittorio Gassman: Remo
 Nino Manfredi: Quirino
 Silvana Mangano: Marina
 Dorian Gray: Eleonora Franzetti
 Franca Valeri: Giovanna
 Georges Rivière: Eleonora's Lover
 Bernard Blier: Police Commissioner
 Sylva Koscina: Carolina
 Tino Scotti: Fiorenzo

References

External links
 

1960 films
Commedia all'italiana
Films directed by Mario Camerini
Italian crime comedy films
Films about gambling
Films set in Monaco
1960s comedy mystery films
Films produced by Dino De Laurentiis
1960s crime comedy films
Italian comedy mystery films
1960 comedy films
Films with screenplays by Luciano Vincenzoni
1960s Italian films